Sariya Akhmedovna Lakoba (born Sariya Akhmedovna Dzhikh-Ogly ; 1904 – 16 May 1939), was a Soviet woman who was the spouse of Nestor Lakoba, the leader of Abkhazia. She came from a wealthy Adjarian noble family. Her family was Muslim and very conservative and she wore a veil in her youth. Sariya and Nestor met in her parents' home when he was hiding from the British occupation forces. They fell in love and she ran away with him. A very calm and silent woman, she loved reading and collecting books. Sariya never finished school, but was self-educated and well read, and knew several languages. During their married life, she and Nestor often visited Moscow to attend official events. High-ranking members of the Party and the Government frequently visited their home in Abkhazia during vacations. She was friends with the second wife of Joseph Stalin, Nadezhda Alliluyeva, who once gave her a handgun as a present. Stalin also liked her.

Sariya was arrested soon after Nestor's death in 1939, and was imprisoned in Tbilisi. The NKVD tortured her every evening and beat her severely in order to have her sign a statement against Lakoba and denounce him as an enemy of the Soviet Union. Her reply each time was, "I will not defame the memory of my husband", so their son Rauf, aged 14, was arrested, brought to the jail where his mother was held, threatened with death if she did not testify, and beaten in front of her. Sariya repeated refusals to confess angered the NKVD agents, and she finally died in her cell after a night of torture. Rauf was sent to a labour camp, and was eventually shot in a Sukhumi prison on 28 July 1941.

References

Bibliography

Further reading

1904 births
1939 deaths
Abkhazian murder victims
Great Purge victims
People from Batumi
People from Batum Oblast